Dana Kunze (born 1960–1961) is an American champion high-diver. He has held the world records for the highest dives. Kunze began his professional high diving career in 1974 at the age of 13. He won his first world championship in 1977 and maintained a winning streak for seven years.

Since 1985, Kunze has operated a company, Water Show Productions, that specializes in high dive-themed aquatic shows.

Notes

External links

Official website

Living people
American male divers
Male high divers
1960 births